Inga Maria Ålenius (15 May 1938 – 23 April 2017, in Stockholm) was a Swedish actress. She is best known for her role as "Lisen" in Fanny and Alexander.

Early life and career
Ålenius was born on 15 May 1938 and educated at the City Theater's drama school in Norrköping. She worked at the County Theater in Västerås, People's Theater in Gothenburg, and the National Theater. Her first film credit was the 1968 film , a film starring the pop/rock group Sven-Ingvars.

She worked with Ingmar Bergman on his 1982 film Fanny and Alexander. She also worked in television, playing the role of "Astrid" on Hem till byn, Sweden's longest running TV series, for 30 years. Ålenius had starred alongside actor Nils Poppe in several roles during the early 1990s.

Later years and death
After turning 70, Ålenius moved to the town of Helsingborg. Her last role was in the play I Sista Minuten. Ålenius died following a brief illness in 2017, aged 78.

Filmography
1968: Under ditt parasoll - Kristina från Vilhelmina
1971-2006: Hem till byn (TV Series) - Astrid Ljung
1976: Raskens (TV Mini-Series) - Maid
1979: Den nya människan - Personal på ungdomshemmet
1980: Mor gifter sig (TV Mini-Series) - Sockersirupen
1981: Sista budet - Rosita
1982: Fanny and Alexander - Lisen - Ekdahlska huset
1988: Polisen som vägrade ta semester (TV Mini-Series) - Agata Gärdin
1991: The Best Intentions (TV Mini-Series) - Alva Nykvist
1992: The Best Intentions - Alva Nykvist
1996: Rusar i hans famn - Lady in the Shop
1996: Skilda världar (TV Series) - Dagmar Larsson
1996: Att stjäla en tjuv - Mrs. Fahlström
1998: Beck – Pensionat Pärlan (TV Series) - Kvinnliga grannen
1999: In Bed with Santa - Signe
2000: The New Country (TV Movie) - Gumman
2001: Woman with Birthmark (TV Mini-Series) - Helena Wagner
2001: Kommissarie Winter (TV Series) - Louises mamma
2002: Pappa polis (TV Mini-Series) - Mormor
2003: Lillebror på tjuvjakt - Märta
2003: Capricciosa - Margit
2004: Masjävlar - Anna

References

Further reading

External links

Inga Ålenius on Swedish Film Database

1938 births
2017 deaths
Swedish television actresses
Actresses from Stockholm